The 1905 Montana football team represented the University of Montana in the 1905 college football season. They were led by first-year head coach Frederick Schule, and finished the season with a record of two wins and three losses (2–3).

Schedule

References

Montana
Montana Grizzlies football seasons
Montana football